Alexander Rudolfovich Geynrikh (born 6 October 1984) is an Uzbek former footballer who played as a forward for the Uzbekistan national team.

Career
After spending the first six-months of the 2005 season on loan at Pakhtakor Tashkent, Geynrikh joined Torpedo Moscow in August 2005.

On 26 February 2011, Pakhtakor Tashkent announced that Geynrikh had moved to South Korean K-League club Suwon Bluewings on a one-year loan deal. He scored on his K-League debut for Suwon, in the 2-0 opening day win over FC Seoul on 6 March 2011.

On 14 June 2012, Aktobe announced the signing of Geynrikh. Geynrikh made his debut two days later in Aktobe's 2–1 victory against Sunkar. After two years with Aktobe, Geynrikh's contract was terminated on 11 June 2014.

After leaving Lokomotiv Tashkent FK by mutual consent at the beginning of 2015, Geynrikh returned to the Kazakhstan Premier League in February of the same year, signing with FC Ordabasy.

After training with FC Aktobe at the start of the 2018 season, Geynrikh retired and became a youth coach at Aktobe in March 2018.

Career statistics

Club

International

Statistics accurate as of match played 5 September 2017

International goals
Scores and results list Uzbekistan's goal tally first.

Honours

Club
CSKA Moscow
Russian Premier League champion: (1) 2003

Pakhtakor Tashkent
Uzbek League champion: (3) 2002, 2005, 2007
Uzbek Cup winner: (3) 2002, 2005, 2007

Suwon Bluewings
Korean FA Cup runner-up: (1) 2011

Aktobe
Kazakhstan Premier League champion: (1) 2013
Kazakhstan Super Cup (1): 2014

International
 AFC Asian Cup 4th: 2011

Individual

 Uzbekistan Player of the Year : 2002
 Uzbekistan Player of the Year 2nd (2): 2004, 2006

References

External links

1984 births
Living people
Uzbekistani footballers
Uzbekistan international footballers
Association football forwards
2004 AFC Asian Cup players
2007 AFC Asian Cup players
Russian and Soviet-German people
Uzbekistani people of German descent
Uzbekistani people of Russian descent
Pakhtakor Tashkent FK players
PFC CSKA Moscow players
FC Torpedo Moscow players
Suwon Samsung Bluewings players
Emirates Club players
FC Ordabasy players
K League 1 players
Russian Premier League players
Kazakhstan Premier League players
Expatriate footballers in South Korea
Expatriate footballers in Russia
Expatriate footballers in the United Arab Emirates
Expatriate footballers in Kazakhstan
Uzbekistani expatriate footballers
Uzbekistani expatriate sportspeople in Russia
Uzbekistani expatriate sportspeople in South Korea
Uzbekistani expatriate sportspeople in the United Arab Emirates
Uzbekistani expatriate sportspeople in Kazakhstan
Sportspeople from Tashkent
2011 AFC Asian Cup players
Footballers at the 2006 Asian Games
People from Angren, Uzbekistan
UAE Pro League players
Asian Games competitors for Uzbekistan